Boonea suoana is a species of sea snail, a marine gastropod mollusk in the family Pyramidellidae, the pyrams and their allies. The species is one of eleven known species within the Boonea genus of gastropods.

Distribution
This marine species occurs off the coasts of Japan in the Pacific Ocean.

References

 Hori, S. & Nakamura, Y. (1999). Two new species of the Pyramidellidae (Orthogastropoda: Heterobranchia) parasitic on bivalves in Yamaguchi Prefecture.; Jap. Jour. Malac. (4) 58 : 165-174

External links
 To Encyclopedia of Life
 To USNM Invertebrate Zoology Mollusca Collection
 To World Register of Marine Species

Pyramidellidae
Gastropods described in 1999